Olakunle Joel Adewale (born 13 May 1981) is a Nigerian social entrepreneur and visual artist who founded Tender Arts Nigeria in 2013, an organization with focus on Therapeutic arts, arts in health, talent development, community empowerment and civic engagement through visual, literary and performing arts which benefit children, youth, adults and the aged across the world. Also, on October 10, 2021, he launched the first ever Mental health fellowship where he helps amplify the voices of young people interested in mental health and that with also provides a form of mental healing to the fellows.

In 2015, he met President Barack Obama in the United States through Mandela Washington Fellowship for leadership influence in using arts to improve the lives of people in the communities and in 2019, he  received an international recognition in the United States as August 2 was declared  as “Kunle Adewale Day” by the Mayor of Cincinnati, John Cranley in recognition of his contribution to the United States in both fields of Arts and Medicine.

Early life and education 
Adewale was born on 13 May 1981 as the ninth child in the family of fourteen children in Mushin, a suburb of Lagos State where he went on to complete his primary and secondary school education at Mushin Mainland Model Primary School before proceeding to St. Joseph Boy's Secondary School, Surulere, Lagos. Thereafter, he proceeded to Auchi Polytechnic to study Painting and General Arts and later obtained a Bachelor of Art degree in Fine and Applied Arts from Obafemi Awolowo University, Ile-Ife. He went on to study Civic Leadership from Tulane University, New Orleans in 2015 and Arts in Medicine summer intensive from the University of Florida.

Art career
Adewale started art during his teenage years working on comics, Bible characters, creative writings and later metamorphose to doing it professionally.

In 2019, he was honoured for his contributions to arts in medicine field by the Mayor of Cincinnati, Mayor John Cranley as August 2, 2019 was proclaimed as “Kunle Adewale Day” in Cincinnati, Ohio, USA and became the first International Artist in Residence of the Eyes of the Artists Foundation.

Books 
Adewale has published two books, which include the following:

 Seed For Seasons
 Why Sit We Here Till We Die? A tale of 4 lepers

Awards and recognitions

2014, Nominated for Global Teacher Prize
2015 YNaija top 10 most influential Nigerians under 40 (Advocacy)
2015, Young African ambassador for Art and Culture
2016 Commonwealth Youth Award for West Africa region
2016, Member of Art Therapy Without Borders, Inc. 
2018, JCI Ten Outstanding Young Persons of Nigeria awardee
2018, International Advocate For persons living Sickle Cell Anemia. 
2019, World Bank Social Inclusion Hero from Nigeria
2019. Atlantic Fellow of Global Brain Health Institute, University of California

References 

 Nigerian artist, Kunle Adewale gets special day in U.S.
 Meet the young man using art to help patients in Nigerian hospitals

Living people
Nigerian businesspeople
1981 births
Nigerian artists
Tulane University alumni
University of Florida alumni
Yoruba artists
Yoruba businesspeople
Nigerian expatriates in the United States
Auchi Polytechnic alumni
Obafemi Awolowo University alumni
Nigerian social entrepreneurs
People from Lagos
Residents of Lagos